Main page: List of Canadian plants by family

Families:
A | B | C | D | E | F | G | H | I J K | L | M | N | O | P Q | R | S | T | U V W | X Y Z

Oedipodiaceae 

 Oedipodium griffithianum

Oleaceae 

 Fraxinus americana — white ash
 Fraxinus latifolia — Oregon ash
 Fraxinus nigra — black ash
 Fraxinus pennsylvanica — green ash
 Fraxinus profunda — pumpkin ash
 Fraxinus quadrangulata — blue ash

Onagraceae 

 Boisduvalia densiflora — denseflower spike-primrose
 Boisduvalia glabella — smooth spike-primrose
 Calylophus serrulatus — yellow evening-primrose
 Camissonia andina — Blackfoot River suncup
 Camissonia breviflora — shortflower suncup
 Camissonia contorta — dwarf contorted suncup
 Circaea alpina — small enchanter's-nightshade
 Circaea lutetiana — southern broadleaf enchanter's-nightshade
 Circaea x intermedia — intermediate enchanger's-nightshade
 Clarkia amoena — farewell-to-spring
 Clarkia pulchella — largeflower clarkia
 Clarkia purpurea — winecup clarkia
 Clarkia rhomboidea — tongue clarkia
 Epilobium anagallidifolium — alpine willowherb
 Epilobium angustifolium — fireweed
 Epilobium arcticum — arctic willowherb
 Epilobium brachycarpum — panicled willowherb
 Epilobium ciliatum — hairy willowherb
 Epilobium clavatum — clavate-fruit willowherb
 Epilobium coloratum — purpleleaf willowherb
 Epilobium davuricum — Dahuria willowherb
 Epilobium foliosum — California willowherb
 Epilobium glaberrimum — glaucous willowherb
 Epilobium halleanum — glandular willowherb
 Epilobium hornemannii — Hornemann's willowherb
 Epilobium lactiflorum — whiteflower willowherb
 Epilobium latifolium — river beauty
 Epilobium leptocarpum — slender-fruited willowherb
 Epilobium leptophyllum — linear-leaved willowherb
 Epilobium luteum — yellow willowherb
 Epilobium minutum — smallflower willowherb
 Epilobium mirabile — Olimple Mountain willowherb
 Epilobium oregonense — Oregon willowherb
 Epilobium palustre — marsh willowherb
 Epilobium saximontanum — Rocky Mountain willowherb
 Epilobium strictum — downy willowherb
 Epilobium x wisconsinense
 Gaura biennis — biennial gaura
 Gaura coccinea — scarlet gaura
 Gayophytum diffusum — diffuse groundsmoke
 Gayophytum humile — low groundsmoke
 Gayophytum racemosum — racemed groundsmoke
 Gayophytum ramosissimum — much-branch groundsmoke
 Ludwigia alternifolia — bushy seedbox
 Ludwigia palustris — marsh seedbox
 Ludwigia polycarpa — many-fruit false-loosestrife
 Oenothera biennis — common evening-primrose
 Oenothera caespitosa — tufted evening-primrose
 Oenothera clelandii — lesser four-point evening-primrose
 Oenothera elata — Hooker's evening-primrose
 Oenothera flava — long-tubed evening-primrose
 Oenothera fruticosa — narrowleaf sundrops
 Oenothera nuttallii — white-stemmed evening-primrose
 Oenothera oakesiana — Oakes' evening-primrose
 Oenothera pallida — pale evening-primrose
 Oenothera parviflora — northern evening-primrose
 Oenothera perennis — small sundrops
 Oenothera pilosella — meadow evening-primrose
 Oenothera villosa — hairy evening-primrose

Ophioglossaceae 

 Botrychium acuminatum — moonwort
 Botrychium ascendens — upward-lobed moonwort
 Botrychium boreale — northern moonwort
 Botrychium campestre — prairie dunewort
 Botrychium crenulatum — crenulate moonwort
 Botrychium dissectum — cutleaf grapefern
 Botrychium hesperium — western moonwort
 Botrychium lanceolatum — triangle grapefern
 Botrychium lineare — narrowleaf grapefern
 Botrychium lunaria — moonwort grapefern
 Botrychium matricariifolium — chamomile grapefern
 Botrychium minganense — Mingan's moonwort
 Botrychium montanum — mountain moonwort
 Botrychium mormo — little goblin moonwort
 Botrychium multifidum — leathery grapefern
 Botrychium oneidense — bluntlobe grapefern
 Botrychium pallidum — pale moonwort
 Botrychium paradoxum — peculiar moonwort
 Botrychium pedunculosum — stalked moonwort
 Botrychium pinnatum — northern moonwort
 Botrychium pseudopinnatum — false daisyleaf grapefern
 Botrychium rugulosum — rugulose grapefern
 Botrychium simplex — least grapefern
 Botrychium spathulatum — spoonleaf moonwort
 Botrychium tunux
 Botrychium virginianum — rattlesnake fern
 Botrychium x watertonense
 Botrychium yaaxudakeit
 Ophioglossum pusillum — northern adder's-tongue
 Ophioglossum vulgatum — southern adder's-tongue

Orchidaceae 

 Amerorchis rotundifolia — round-leaved orchis
 Aplectrum hyemale — puttyroot
 Arethusa bulbosa — dragon's mouth
 Calopogon tuberosus — tuberous grass-pink
 Calypso bulbosa — fairy slipper
 Cephalanthera austiniae — phantom orchid
 Coeloglossum viride — longbract green orchis
 Corallorhiza maculata — spotted coralroot
 Corallorhiza mertensiana — Merten's coralroot
 Corallorhiza odontorhiza — autumn coralroot
 Corallorhiza striata — striped coralroot
 Corallorhiza trifida — early coralroot
 Cypripedium acaule — pink lady's-slipper
 Cypripedium arietinum — ram's-head lady's-slipper
 Cypripedium candidum — small white lady's-slipper
 Cypripedium guttatum — spotted lady's-slipper
 Cypripedium montanum — mountain lady's-slipper
 Cypripedium parviflorum — American yellow lady's-slipper
 Cypripedium passerinum — sparrow's-egg lady's-slipper
 Cypripedium reginae — showy lady's-slipper
 Cypripedium x andrewsii — Andrews' lady's-slipper
 Cypripedium x columbianum — Columbian lady's-slipper
 Cypripedium x favillianum
 Cypripedium x landonii — Landon's lady's-slipper
 Dactylorhiza praetermissa — southern marsh orchid
 Epipactis gigantea — giant helleborine
 Galearis spectabilis — showy orchis
 Goodyera oblongifolia — giant rattlesnake-plantain
 Goodyera pubescens — downy rattlesnake-plantain
 Goodyera repens — dwarf rattlesnake-plantain
 Goodyera tesselata — checkered rattlesnake-plantain
 Isotria medeoloides — small whorled pogonia
 Isotria verticillata — large whorled pogonia
 Liparis liliifolia — large twayblade
 Liparis loeselii — Lösel's twayblade
 Malaxis brachypoda — white adder's-mouth
 Malaxis diphyllos — Aleutian adder's-mouth
 Malaxis paludosa — bog adder's-mouth
 Malaxis unifolia — green adder's-mouth
 Neottia auriculata — auricled twayblade
 Neottia australis — southern twayblade
 Neottia borealis — northern twayblade
 Neottia caurina — western twayblade
 Neottia convallarioides — broad-leaved twayblade
 Neottia cordata — heartleaf twayblade
 Neottia x veltmanii — Veltman's twayblade
 Piperia candida — white piperia
 Piperia elegans — hillside rein orchid
 Piperia elongata — denseflower rein orchid
 Piperia transversa — royal rein orchid
 Piperia unalascensis — Alaska rein orchid
 Platanthera albida — vanilla-scent bog orchid
 Platanthera aquilonis
 Platanthera blephariglottis — white-fringe orchis
 Platanthera chorisiana — Choriso bog orchid
 Platanthera clavellata — small green woodland orchid
 Platanthera dilatata — leafy white orchis
 Platanthera flava — southern rein orchid
 Platanthera grandiflora — large purple-fringe orchis
 Platanthera hookeri — Hooker's orchis
 Platanthera hyperborea — leafy northern green orchid
 Platanthera lacera — green-fringe orchis
 Platanthera leucophaea — eastern prairie white-fringed orchid
 Platanthera leucostachys — Bog rein orchid,   scentbottle
 Platanthera obtusata — small northern bog orchid
 Platanthera orbiculata — large roundleaf orchid
 Platanthera praeclara — western prairie white-fringed orchid
 Platanthera psycodes — small purple-fringe orchis
 Platanthera stricta — slender bog orchid
 Platanthera x andrewsii — Andrews' platanthera
 Platanthera x hollandiae — Holland's platanthera
 Platanthera x keenanii — Keenan's platanthera
 Platanthera x media
 Platanthera x reznicekii — Reznicek's platanthera
 Platanthera x vossii — Voss' platanthera
 Pogonia ophioglossoides — rose pogonia
 Spiranthes casei — Case's ladies'-tresses
 Spiranthes cernua — nodding ladies'-tresses
 Spiranthes lacera — southern slender ladies'-tresses
 Spiranthes lucida — shining ladies'-tresses
 Spiranthes magnicamporum — Great Plains ladies'-tresses
 Spiranthes ochroleuca — yellow nodding ladies'-tresses
 Spiranthes ovalis — lesser ladies'-tresses
 Spiranthes romanzoffiana — hooded ladies'-tresses
 Spiranthes x intermedia
 Spiranthes x simpsonii — Simpson's ladies'-tresses
 Triphora trianthophora — nodding pogonia

Orobanchaceae 

 Boschniakia hookeri — Vancouver groundcone
 Boschniakia rossica — northern groundcone
 Boschniakia strobilacea — California groundcone
 Conopholis americana — American cancer-root
 Epifagus virginiana — beechdrops
 Orobanche californica — California broomrape
 Orobanche corymbosa — flat-top broomrape
 Orobanche fasciculata — clustered broomrape
 Orobanche ludoviciana — Louisiana broomrape
 Orobanche pinorum — pine broomrape
 Orobanche uniflora — one-flowered broomrape

Orthotrichaceae 

 Amphidium californicum
 Amphidium lapponicum
 Amphidium mougeotii
 Drummondia prorepens
 Orthotrichum affine
 Orthotrichum alpestre
 Orthotrichum anomalum
 Orthotrichum consimile
 Orthotrichum cupulatum
 Orthotrichum gymnostomum
 Orthotrichum hallii
 Orthotrichum laevigatum
 Orthotrichum lyellii
 Orthotrichum obtusifolium — blunt bristle-moss
 Orthotrichum ohioense
 Orthotrichum pallens
 Orthotrichum pellucidum
 Orthotrichum pulchellum
 Orthotrichum pumilum
 Orthotrichum pusillum
 Orthotrichum pylaisii
 Orthotrichum rivulare
 Orthotrichum rupestre
 Orthotrichum sordidum
 Orthotrichum speciosum
 Orthotrichum stellatum
 Orthotrichum stramineum
 Orthotrichum strangulatum
 Orthotrichum striatum
 Orthotrichum tenellum
 Ulota coarctata
 Ulota crispa
 Ulota curvifolia
 Ulota drummondii
 Ulota hutchinsiae
 Ulota megalospora
 Ulota obtusiuscula
 Ulota phyllantha
 Zygodon conoideus
 Zygodon gracilis
 Zygodon reinwardtii
 Zygodon viridissimus

Osmundaceae 

 Osmunda claytoniana — interrupted fern
 Osmunda spectabilis — royal fern
 Osmundastrum cinnamomeum — cinnamon fern

Oxalidaceae 

 Oxalis dillenii — Dillen's woodsorrel
 Oxalis montana — white woodsorrel
 Oxalis oregana — Oregon woodsorrel
 Oxalis stricta — common yellow woodsorrel
 Oxalis suksdorfii — western yellow oxalis